The Australian Defence Force's (ADF) ranks of officers and enlisted personnel in each of its three service branches of the Royal Australian Navy (RAN), the Australian Army, and the Royal Australian Air Force (RAAF) inherited their rank structures from their British counterparts. The insignia used to identify these ranks are also generally similar to those used in the British Armed Forces.

The following tables show the "equivalent rank and classifications" for the three services, as defined in the ADF Pay and Conditions Manual. "Equivalent rank" means the corresponding rank set out under Regulation 8 of the Defence Force Regulations 1952.

Commissioned officer ranks

Warrant officer ranks

 As Army WO2s hold a Warrant, while the RAN CPO and RAAF FSGT do not, WO2s are addressed as "Sir" or "Ma'am" by junior ranks, which extends to OCDTs and SCDTs.

Non-commissioned officer ranks

Other ranks

Insignia

Commissioned officers
The rank insignia for commissioned officers for the navy, army and air force respectively.

Enlisted
The rank insignia for enlisted personnel for the navy, army and air force respectively.

History of Royal Australian Navy enlisted ranks
The historical changes to rank insignia for enlisted personnel of the navy.

History of Australian Army enlisted ranks

See also
Royal Australian Navy ranks and uniforms
Australian Army officer rank insignia
Australian Army enlisted rank insignia
Royal Australian Air Force (RAAF) rank insignia

Notes

References

External links
 ADF Badges of rank (copyright)
 ADF Pay & Conditions Manual - Equivalent ranks and classifications